The Missing Links is the fourth studio album by Pennsylvania hardcore punk band Wisdom In Chains. It was released in 2012 on I Scream Records.

Track list

References

2012 albums
Wisdom in Chains albums